Vincent Tremblay (born October 21, 1959) is a Canadian former professional ice hockey goaltender who played 58 games in the National Hockey League between 1980 and 1984. He played with the Pittsburgh Penguins and Toronto Maple Leafs.

Career
He was invited to try out for the Canadian 1980 Winter Olympics men's ice hockey team but left to consider a professional contract from the Toronto Maple Leafs.

Career statistics

Regular season and playoffs

References

External links
 

1959 births
Living people
Baltimore Skipjacks players
Canadian ice hockey goaltenders
French Quebecers
Ice hockey people from Quebec City
New Brunswick Hawks players
Pittsburgh Penguins players
Quebec Remparts players
Rochester Americans players
St. Catharines Saints players
Toronto Maple Leafs draft picks
Toronto Maple Leafs players